Fili is a surface-level station on the Filyovskaya Line of the Moscow Metro. The station was opened on 7 November 1959, as the last surface side platform station on the line. The dual platforms are protected by canopies and are intersected at either end by road overpasses that provide additional shelter for waiting passengers. Two glazed upper-level entrance vestibule at both end of the station allow passengers to change platforms. Robert Pogrebnoi and Yuriy Zenkevich were the main architects for the station's design. Daily passenger volume is approximately 30,100.

External links

metro.ru
mymetro.ru
KartaMetro.info — Station location and exits on Moscow map (English/Russian)
http://www.interfax-russia.ru/Moscow/news.asp?id=698901&sec=1668Moscow Metro stations reconstruction starts in 2017

Railway stations in Russia opened in 1959
Filyovskaya Line